Once a single-crop agricultural economy, Saint Lucia has shifted to a tourism and banking serviced-based economy. Tourism, the island's biggest industry and main source of jobs, income and foreign exchange, accounts for 65% of its GDP. Agriculture, which was once the biggest industry, now contributes to less than 3% of GDP, but still accounts for 20% of jobs. The banana industry is now on a decline due to strong competition from low-cost Latin American producers and reduced European trade preferences, but the government has helped revitalize the industry, with 13,734 tonnes exported in 2018. Agricultural crops grown for export are bananas, mangoes, and avocados. The island is considered to have the most diverse and well-developed manufacturing industry in the eastern Caribbean.

Saint Lucia has been able to attract many foreign businesses and investors.

Economic history 
The island's banana output was heavily impacted in 2007 by  Hurricane Dean. In 2006, the governor stated:
While living standards have improved for many, a large number of people have been pushed to the margin of economic activity, especially in the areas which once depended heavily on the banana industry for a livelihood.

Sectors

Agriculture 

Agriculture is the second-largest industry in Saint Lucia. In 2020, agriculture only contributed 2.2% to Saint Lucia's GDP, but still accounts for a significant number of jobs - some 10% of the employed population. As of the 2010 census, the roughly 10,000 agricultural holdings covered an area of 30,204 acres, an average of 3.0 acres per agricultural holding.

About 18% of the land is used for agricultural practices. Most farms consist of less than 5 acres of land. The main agricultural products grown in Saint Lucia are bananas, coconuts, cocoa beans, mangoes, avocados, vegetables, citrus fruits, and root crops such as yams and sweet potatoes. Most of these agricultural products are grown for local consumption, but bananas and coconuts are mainly grown for export, with some vegetables. Bananas occupy about 14,826 acres of the agricultural land, while coconuts occupy 12,400 acres.

Saint Lucia has a small livestock sector, which is dominated by poultry and pork. The island is self-sufficient in egg production and is trying to become self-sufficient in poultry and pork production. The Ministry of Agriculture is encouraging farmers to raise sheep and goats to reduce the island's importation of frozen meats, and has helped by providing support to farmers, importing bloodlines of livestock to increase the productivity of animals, and providing subsidies on animal feed.

Help is also being given to revitalize the local dairy and beef industries through the introduction of efficient cattle breeds, training of farmers to care properly for livestock, and establishing funds for the construction of dairy units and abattoirs.

The island is also looking to expand its exports under the Taste of Saint Lucia brand sponsored by Export Saint Lucia. Products that are being promoted include Saint Lucia Honey, rum, chocolate, coconut oil, granola, and insect repellent.

Tourism
The island currently attracts over 900,000 visitors annually. St Lucia has been able to attract foreign businesses and investment, especially in its offshore banking and tourism industries. Tourism is St Lucia's main source of jobs and income, accounting for 65% of GDP, and the island's main source of foreign exchange earnings. The northern end of St Lucia is tourism's most urbanized area, with a fair number of hotels and resorts located along beaches, or with seaside views. This is also home to many of the island's large, all-inclusive resorts.

Economic trends
The level of island households living at or below the poverty level increased from 18.7 to 21.4% from 1995 to 2005. As of 2006, another 16.2% of the island's population are vulnerable to economic shocks that could easily push them below the poverty line.  One rural district had 44.9% of households living below the poverty line (2005).

To broaden the island's economic base, the government added small, computer-driven information technology and financial services as development objectives.

St. Lucia's leading revenue producers—agriculture, tourism, and small-scale manufacturing—benefited from a focus on infrastructure improvements in roads, communications, water supply, sewerage, and port facilities. Foreign investors also have been attracted by the infrastructure improvements and by the educated and skilled work force and relatively stable political conditions. The largest investment is in a petroleum storage and transshipment terminal built by Hess Oil. The Caribbean Development Bank  funded an airport expansion project.

Until the events of 11 September 2001, the tourism sector had made significant gains, experiencing a boom despite some untimely and destructive hurricanes. Stay-over visitors and cruise arrivals declined in 2001, and several hotels declared bankruptcy, including the Hyatt. The development of the tourism sector remains a priority, and the government is committed to providing a favourable investment environment. Incentives are available for building and upgrading tourism facilities. Use of public funds to improve the physical infrastructure of the island has been liberal, and the government has made efforts to attract cultural and sporting events and develop historical sites.

Overview
St. Lucia's economy depends primarily on revenue from tourism and banana production, with some contribution from small-scale manufacturing.

Although banana revenues have helped fund the country's development since the 1960s, the industry is now in a terminal decline, due to reduced European Union trade preferences and competition from lower-cost Latin American banana producers. The country is encouraging farmers to plant crops such as cocoa, mangoes, and avocados to diversify its agricultural production and provide jobs for displaced banana workers.

Tourism recovered in 2004, following the post-11 September 2001 recession, and continued to grow in 2005, making up more than 48% of St. Lucia's GDP. The hotel and restaurant industry grew by 6.3% during 2005. Stay-over arrivals increased by 6.5%, and the United States remained the most important market, accounting for 35.4% of these arrivals. Yacht passengers rose by 21.9%. Redeployment of cruise ships, remedial berth construction, and high fuel costs prevented higher growth rates. However, several investors have planned new tourism projects for the island, including a large hotel and resort in the southern part of the island. The global recession has caused a reduction in tourist revenue and foreign investment, significantly slowing growth rates.

St. Lucia's currency is the Eastern Caribbean Dollar (EC$), a regional currency shared among members of the Eastern Caribbean Currency Union (ECCU). The Eastern Caribbean Central Bank (ECCB) issues the EC$, manages monetary policy, and regulates and supervises commercial banking activities in its member countries. The ECCB has kept the EC$ pegged at EC$2.7 = US$1.

St. Lucia is a beneficiary of the U.S. Caribbean Basin Initiative and is a member of the Caribbean Community and Common Market. The country hosts the executive secretariat of the Organization of Eastern Caribbean States.

St. Lucia is the headquarters of the Eastern Caribbean Telecommunications authority, which is developing the regulations to liberalize the telecommunications sector in the region by 2004.

Economic statistics

GDP: purchasing power party - $1,667 billion (2016 est.)

GDP - real growth rate: 3.5% (2012 est.)

GDP - per capita: purchasing power party - $12,952 (2016 est.)

GDP - composition by sector:
agriculture: 2.43%
industry: 13.43%
services: 84.14% (2016 est.)

Population below poverty line: 21.4% (2005)

Household income or consumption by percentage share:
lowest 10%:
NA%
highest 10%:
NA%

Inflation rate (consumer prices): -0.934% (2016 est.)

Labour force: 50,300 (2011)

Labour force - by occupation:
agriculture 21.7%,
industry and commerce 24.7%,
services 53.6% (2002 est.)

Unemployment rate: 15% (2013 est.)

Pay:
best is $350 a week

Budget:
revenues:
$141.2 million
expenditures:
$146.7 million, including capital expenditures of $25.1 million (2000 estimate)
Industries:
clothing, assembly of electronic components, beverages, corrugated cardboard boxes, tourism, lime processing, coconut processing

Industrial production growth rate:
8.9% (1997 est.)

Electricity - production: 281 GWh (2003)

Electricity - production by source:
fossil fuel:
100%
hydro:
0%
nuclear:
0%
other:
0% (1998)

Electricity - consumption: 102 KWh (1998)

Agriculture - products:
bananas, coconuts, vegetables, citrus, root crops, cocoa

Exports: $82 million (2004)

Exports - commodities:
bananas 41%, clothing, cocoa, vegetables, fruits, coconut oil

Exports - partners:
France 25%, United States 18.3%, United Kingdom 14.5%, Brazil 6.8% (2005)

Imports:
$410 million (2004)

Imports - commodities:
food 23%, manufactured goods 21%, machinery and transportation equipment 19%, chemicals, fuels

Imports - partners:
United States 23.8%, Trinidad and Tobago 16%, Netherlands 11.1%, Venezuela 6.3%, Finland 6.2%, United Kingdom 5.7%, France 4.7% (2005)

Debt - external:
$214 million (2000)

Economic aid - recipient: $51.8 million (1995)

Currency: 1 East Caribbean dollar (EC$) = 100 cents

Exchange rates: East Caribbean dollars (EC$) per US$1 – 2.7000 (fixed rate since 1976)

Fiscal year: 1 April – 31 March

References

 
Saint Lucia